Sistina is a very rare italian surname.

References

Surnames